Annerley Emma Gordon (born 12 November 1967), most known professionally as Ann Lee, is a British Eurodance singer and songwriter who rose to fame in the late 1990s. She is known primarily for her hit singles "2 Times" and "Voices", both released in 1999.

Career
Having moved to live in Italy in the late 1980s, Gordon released a few Eurobeat solo singles under the Italian label A.Beat-C. under the names Annerley Gordon and Annalise. Gordon is credited with contributing to the composition of "The Rhythm of the Night", released in Italy in December 1993 on the DWA record label, by Eurodance project Corona.

Gordon's first solo single under the name "Ann Lee" was "2 Times", originally released in 1998. It was re-released in early 1999 and became a Top 10 hit in Austria, France, Germany, Italy, Netherlands and Norway, as well as in Australia and New Zealand. It also hit number 2 in her native United Kingdom, and reached number one in Flanders and Denmark. In Canada it reached number 14 on the singles chart. "2 Times" was featured in the 2001 film Head Over Heels as the movie's theme song.

Lee's second single, "Voices", fared considerably less well, although it was a Top 10 hit in the Czech Republic, Denmark and Spain, and Top 30 in the United Kingdom.

2007 saw the return of Lee with the album, So Alive, with the single "Catches Your Love". In 2009, she released the single, "2 People", uner the Off Limits label. In December of that year, Lee provided the vocals for Favretto's single "I Get The Feeling", also released by Off Limits.

Personal life
Lee bought a house in Italy in 2005, and had a son born the same year.

Discography

Albums
 1999: Dreams
 2007: So Alive

Singles

References

External links
 Official Website
 Official MySpace Profile

1967 births
Eurobeat musicians
Eurodance musicians
English electronic musicians
English women singers
Living people
Musicians from Sheffield
English expatriates in Italy
English women in electronic music
Avex Group artists